Romann Berrux (born 13 August 2001) is a French actor known for his roles as Hugo Roche on the French television show Détectives and as young Fergus on the Starz drama Outlander.

Career 
Berrux began working professionally as an actor in his home country of France at the age of five. In 2016, he began studying acting with Clarence Tokley at the Bilingual Acting Workshop's BAW Teen Film Acting Workshop in Paris.

The part of Fergus in Seasons 2 and 3 of Outlander was Berrux's first English-speaking role. He was replaced in the role by French actor César Domboy, who portrays the adult version of the character.

Filmography

Television

Film

References

External links 
 Romann Berrux on IMDb

French male television actors
2001 births
Living people